Jai Hind is a 2012 Indian Kannada-language war film directed by Venugopal, starring Pooja Gandhi and Sandesh. The film is produced by Srinivas Pujar under the banner of Om Sai Production.

Cast
Sandesh as Salim 
Pooja Gandhi as Dr. Anjali
Ramesh Bhat
Thriller Manju
Shobharaj as Sher Khan
Sathyajith as Chand Bhasha

Plot 

This is a single handed war on terrorism. Commando in the Indian Army Bharath considers his nation as his mother. He does not want anyone to cut it like piece of cake. He is very strong and stubborn in his decision.

Captain Bharath is Salim, Captain Bharath is Jai Hind. In his first assignment to trace or trash the terrorist operation he round off terrorist Masood and hand over to the government of India. He gets Shourya Chakra for it. In a short span of time Masood is freed on a hijack of an Indian Air plane with Rs. 2 billion demand set by terrorist gang.

Feeling ashamed of this, Captain Bharath in his second assignment takes his own decision. He seeks the support of his doctor wife Anjali (Pooja Gandhi) in declaring him as dead. As Salim and as Jai Hind, Captain Bharath now with a clue of terrorist attack in prominent places in Bangalore put an end to terrorist activities and surrenders to the government.

For taking law in to his hand Captain Bharath is sentenced for life imprisonment. The public support Captain Bharath but judiciary is above all.

Soundtrack

The Film's Audio was released on 13 August 2011 in Davanagere's Bapuji Auditorium, along with the Cinema Siri event. Jaihind has five songs, composed by Vikram - Siddeshwar  & Krishnavardhan Kulkarni.

Reception

Critical response 

A critic from The Times of India scored the film at 3 out of 5 stars and says "Full marks to Sandesh for his excellent performance. Pooja Gandhi has done justice to her role. Music by Krishnavarada Kulakarni is good. Suryakantha Honnali has done a good job of cinematography". A critic from News18 India wrote "Cinematography is convincing. The actual Army training places and 'Vandematharam' song are well captured by Suryakanth Honnalli. Krishnavardhana Kulkarni banked on the old popular tunes. One Hindi and one Kannada film tunes he has picked shamelessly". A critic from NDTV wrote "While the camera work of Suryakanth Honnali is better, Krishnavardhan Kulkarni's music is below average. Editing work is also mediocre. Jai Hind has a laudable concept, but poor direction mars the film".

References

2012 films
2010s Kannada-language films